Holiday on Ice is an ice show currently owned by Medusa Music Group GmbH, a subsidiary of CTS EVENTIM, Europe's largest ticket distributor, with its headquarters in Bremen, Germany.

History

Holiday on Ice originated in the United States in December 1942. It was the brainchild of Emery Gilbert of Toledo, Ohio, an engineer and builder who created a portable ice rink. He took his idea of a traveling show to Morris Chalfen, a Minneapolis executive, who supplied the financing, and George Tyson, who used his theatrical background to create the show.

The touring show made its first international trip to Mexico in 1947. In 1946, the company expanded with another ice show and secondary unit, "Ice Vogues", which took over the Holiday's last season's production and extended it for another year making stops in Cuba and Hawaii. Then the Vogues toured in Central and South America while Holiday remained in North America. After 1956, the Ice Vogues became a second unit of Holiday on Ice. 

After her touring company was shut down, Sonja Henie joined Holiday on Ice in 1953, remaining part of the show until 1956. Her first performance with the company was in Paris while her final show was in South America.

In Asia, Holiday on Ice first performed at the Philippine International Fair of 1953 in Manila; followed by a return visit in 1955.  Starting in 1961, the company performed almost annually at the newly opened Araneta Coliseum under impresario J. Amado Araneta's auspices.  HOI returned to the Araneta Coliseum in 1962, 1963 and 1965.  The HOI company that performed in Manila was assembled in Europe and recruited cast members from Japan.  

US was represented by Holiday on Ice at Brussels World Fair in 1958. While in 1959, the new Cultural Exchange Program allowed the company to travel to Russia.

All owners except Morris Chalfen sold their shares of the North America Holiday on Ice to Madison Square Garden Corporation in 1964, while Chalfen retained ownership of the international Holiday on Ice tour and remained as executive producer of the North America company.

By , General Ice Shows, Inc., a subsidiary of Thomas Scallen's Medical Investment Corporation (Medicor) and parent company of Ice Follies, had purchased Holiday on Ice (North America) from Chalfen and Madison Square Garden Company. At that time, Chalfen had purchased $2.2 million in Medicor convertible subordinated notes, which when converted to stock would have made Chalfen the largest shareholder of Medicor. Scallen had Medicor stall registering the notes and he sold 400,000 Medicor shares to Arthur Wirtz. After lawsuits by HoI's Chalfen and Wirtz in 1976, Wirtz gained ownership of both shows.

Mattel's Irvin & Kenneth Feld Productions purchased the Ice Follies and the Holiday on Ice (USA) from Chicago-based Wirtz for $12 million in 1979. Ice Follies merged with Holiday on Ice in 1980 operating as a combined show in 1980 and 1981. The first Disney's World on Ice began touring in 1981.

International company
In 1964, Chalfen retained ownership of the international Holiday on Ice tour separating ownership from the North America company.

After several changes of ownership, today it primarily tours with only two productions in Europe. In 1996, the company was purchased by Endemol Entertainment.

On October 2, 2014, the German Medusa Music Group GmbH, a subsidiary of CTS EVENTIM, Europe's largest ticket distributor, acquired 50% of Stage Entertainment Touring Productions and Holiday on Ice; the company would acquire the remaining 50% two years later, on July 8, 2016. Hence, Holiday on Ice has become a German company with Stage Entertainment no longer involved in it.

During the 1960s Holiday on Ice was introduced to the Philippines. Araneta Coliseum always was the venue until Disney on Ice came to Araneta Coliseum.

Show

Holiday on Ice was established as a family-oriented show by its founders but it has retained little of the traditional ice revue format. The actual shows focus more on a theatrical/musical aspect rather than on the glamorous revue style with clouds of feathers and millions of sequins and rhinestones to attract a new, younger audience. The once large "Corps de Ballet" of skaters has been reduced from 24 girls + 12 boys to 20 girls + 10 boys (between 1998 and 2008), and 14 girls + 10 boys (from 2009) and elaborate costuming has been replaced in favour of small modern stylings. Also the music choice from mainly Broadway show scores has been changed and adapted to the contemporary taste of actual pop music and even rock. Novelty acts such as acrobats have been added regularly to the main production numbers in recent years.

A traditional element in each Holiday on Ice show is the precision number with its famous spinning wheel, in which the skaters link arms with each other, one by one, lengthening the two spokes which spin around a center point. For many years, the traditional kickline, the light finale with illuminated costumes and fireworks fountains, ended shows.

Since 1988 each show has been given an official name to expose its unique identity resulting from its main production theme that weaves the various numbers into a unitary presentation.  Beginning in 2005, Holiday on Ice has added several family-oriented touring shows to their schedule, including Peter Pan, Bugs Bunny on Ice and Ali Baba in "1001 Nights on Ice" in their new branch kids Ice shows ("KISS").

In contrast to the North American skating tours Stars on Ice and Champions on Ice, which feature primarily World and Olympic champion figure skaters, most of the skaters who tour with Holiday on Ice are not famous, and the focus is on production quality rather than the skaters' competitive credentials.

In 2011, Stage Entertainment announced the foundation of another subsidiary company which combines all its touring live productions, one of which is Holiday on Ice. This new division, Stage Entertainment Touring productions, is chaired by Caspar Gerwe.

For the first time in its 69 years, Holiday on Ice did not stage a new show production under its own brand in 2012. 
In 2013 a new show choreographed by Mark Naylor was produced with the name "Platinum".

Robin Cousins has choreographed several of Holiday on Ice's recent shows. Former choreographers have included: Stephanie Andros, Willi Bietak, Marie Carr, Kevin J. Cottam, Francis Demarteau, Sarah Kawahara, Karen Kresge, Jérôme Savary, Ted Shuffle, Anthony Van Laast, Robin Cousins, Frank Wentink, Mark Naylor, Bart Doerfler, Christopher Dean, Kim Gavin and Francisco Negrin.

Show themes by year (Holiday on Ice Europe)
2023 
2022 A New Day (resumption) / AURORE
2021 A New Day
2020 (No new production due to Covid-19 pandemic)
2019 Supernova - Journey to the stars
2018 Showtime
2017 Atlantis
2016 Time
2015 Believe
2014 Passion
2013 Platinum
2012 (No new production) but ICE AGE LIVE is presented
2011 Speed and Sleeping Beauty on ice (Stage Entertainment Russia)
2010 Festival and Snow Queen on ice (Stage Entertainment Russia)
2009 Tropicana and Nutcracker on ice (Stage Entertainment Russia)
2008 Energia
2007 Elements (Spirit) and Aladdin on Ice (KIDS)
2006 Mystery and Bugs Bunny on Ice (KIDS)
2005 Romanza and Peter Pan on Ice (KIDS)
2004 Fantasy (Dreams)
2003 Diamonds and Pinocchio on ice (KIDS)
2002 Hollywood
2001 Celebration
2000 In Concert
1999 Colours of Dance
1998 Xotika - Journey to the heart
1997 Extravaganza (Extraventura)
1996 Evolution and Asterix On Ice
1995 Broadway / Gypsy
1994 Jubilee and Circus on ice
1993 Spanish / Aladdin
1992 Magic & Illusions
1991 Carmen & Robin Hood
1990 Banjos & Balalaikas
1989 Journey through Time
1988 Around the World in 80 Days
1987 Italian / Chinese
1986 Mexican / Russian
1985 Disco / Scottish
1984 Counterpoint / Sleeping Beauty
1983 Paris / Swan Lake
1982 Bolero / Shangri-La
1981 Oriental / Western
1980 (No new production due to movement of headquarters to Bern/Switzerland and Amsterdam/The Netherlands) but HOI presented the show : BOLERO / MAZEL'TOV
1979 24 Hours / Cinderella
1979 La Traviata / Hollywood
1978 Alice / Flamenco
1977 Pink Panther / Dickens
1976 Snoopy / Hollywood
1975 Bicentennial
1974 Chicago / Gershwin
1973 Spartacus / Cabaret
1972 Rock / Chevalier
1971 Asterix / Bolero
1970 Fairy Tales
1969 Showboat
1968 King Arthur
1967 Aladdin / Space Show
1966 Marco Polo
1965 Gypsy / Dolly
1964 Hong Kong
1963 Operama
1962 Indian / Jazz
1961 Black Pearl / Circus
1960 Wizard
1959 Aladdin
1958 Nutcracker
1957 Bolero
1956 Merry Widow / Alice
1955 Rhapsody / Red Velvet and Aladdin on ice 
1954 Wonder Garden / Spanish
1953 Jungle / Sea and SONJA HENIE and her ice revue
1952 Pink / Carnival
1951 Indians / Candy
1950 Winter / Gay Nineties

Show themes by year (Holiday on Ice USA)
1984 / 1985 : Ice around the world : Cinderella / San Francisco (HOLIDAY ON ICE)
1971 to 1982 : Ice follies productions in second and third tour under the name HOLIDAY ON ICE USA
1970 Sonja Henie / London
1969 New Year's / Easter/Christmas
1968 New York / Granada
1967 Country / Caribbean
1966 Venetian / Happy Land
1965 Americana / 24 Hours
1964 Blue waltz / Fiesta Caribe
1963 Barn dance / Clock shop
1962 Sleeping Beauty / Broadway
1961 Hawaii / Southland
1960 Golden Aurora
1959 Crystal anniversary / Circus
1958 Girls / Holiday
1957 Waterama / Fiesta
1956 Bacchus / Cavalcade
1955 Bolero / Guardsmen
1954 Storybook / Games
1953 Caribbean / Gaucho
1952 Japan / Fantasy
1951 Jewel / Carnival
1950 Candyland / Rhapsody
1949 Rumbalero / Enchanted Garden
1948 Spanish / Dreams
1947 Persian / Gypsy
1946 Winter Carnival / Horse show
1945 Faster on ice / Rhythmacana
1944 / 1945 : no new show but the second edition 1943/1944 performed until December 1944
1943 / 1944 Victor Herbert / Minstrels
1942 / 1943 Winter Holiday / Gladiators

External links

References

Ice shows
Recurring events established in 1943
Touring performing arts
Feld Entertainment